Martina La Piana (born 26 November 2001) is an Italian olympic boxer. She participated at the 2018 Summer Youth Olympics, being awarded the gold medal in the girls' flyweight event.

References

External links 

2001 births
Living people
Sportspeople from Catania
Italian women boxers
Boxers at the 2018 Summer Youth Olympics
Medalists at the 2018 Summer Youth Olympics
Youth Olympic gold medalists for Italy
21st-century Italian women